Jackie Martin may refer to:
Jackie Martin (cyclist) (born 1971), South African female cyclist
Jackie Martin (footballer) (1914–1996), English footballer
Jackie Martin (photojournalist) (1903–1969), American newspaperwoman